Bathycyathus is a genus of cnidarians belonging to the family Caryophylliidae.

The species of this genus are found in Europe and America.

Species:

Bathycyathus chilensis 
Bathycyathus matheroni 
Bathycyathus pulcher 
Bathycyathus sowerbyi 
Bathycyathus termofurae

References

Caryophylliidae
Scleractinia genera